Thelma Mansfield (born 1949) is an Irish television presenter and artist that worked mainly with RTÉ television. She started out at RTÉ in 1965 as a continuity announcer.

From 1986–97, she co-hosted the RTÉ 1 afternoon show Live at 3  with Derek Davis.

Since retiring in the late 1990s, Mansfield has concentrated on painting and regularly exhibits her work. She married photographer John "Johnny" Morris, son of Michael Morris, 3rd Baron Killanin and twin brother of Mouse Morris. They have two sons.

References

External links
Official Site

Living people
RTÉ television presenters
1949 births
Date of birth missing (living people)
Place of birth missing (living people)